Auri is the debut album by the Finnish/English progressive folk band of the same name. It was released on March 23, 2018 via Nuclear Blast Records.

Track listing

Personnel 
All information from the album booklet.

Auri
 Johanna Kurkela – lead and backing vocals, strings, engineering
 Troy Donockley – uilleann pipes, flutes, guitars, bodhrán, keyboards, lead and backing vocals, engineering
 Tuomas Holopainen – piano, backing vocals, engineering

Additional musicians
 Jyrki Tulilahti – vocals
 Frank Van Essen – strings, violin, drums, percussion
 Phil Barker – bass
 Jonas Pap – cello
 Michael Gill – fiddle
 Lord Paddington – mandolin
 Joomba – equestrian atmospheres

Production
 Tero Kinnunen – engineering
 Tim Oliver – mixing
 Denis Blackman – mastering

Reception 
The Sonic Seducer magazine called the album "a blend of ethereous ethno pop, celtic folk, symphonic orchestration, melodic acoustics and a deeply impressive atmospheric frame", and noted how singer Johanna Kurkela's voice complemented the overall album.

Auri reached number 1 in the Finnish albums chart and entered the top 30 in the charts of Switzerland and Germany.

Charts

References 

2018 debut albums
Auri (band) albums
Nuclear Blast albums